Veritas Technologies LLC. is an American international data management company headquartered in Santa Clara, California. The company has its origins in Tolerant Systems, founded in 1983 and later renamed Veritas Software. It specializes in storage management software including the first commercial journaling file system, VxFS, VxVM, VCS, the personal/small office backup software Backup Exec and the enterprise backup software, NetBackup. Veritas Record Now was an early CD recording software.

Prior to merging with Symantec (now known as Gen Digital) in 2004, Veritas was listed on the S&P 500 and the NASDAQ-100 under the VRTS ticker symbol.

In 2014, Symantec announced that it would demerge its information management business as Veritas Technologies LLC, in order to focus on security. It was purchased as part of the demerger by the private equity firm The Carlyle Group for $8 billion in cash.

History

Early history
The company was founded by Eli Alon and Dale Shipley (both from Intel) as Tolerant Systems in 1983 to build fault-tolerant computer systems based on the idea of "shoe box" building blocks. The shoe box consisted of an OS processor, running a version of Unix called TX, and on which applications ran, and an I/O processor, running a Real Time Executive, developed by Tolerant, called RTE: both processors were 320xx processors. The system was marketed as the "Eternity Series."

The TX software gained a level of fault-tolerance through check-pointing technology. Applications needed to be fortified with this check-pointing to allow roll-back of the application on another processor if a hardware failure occurred. Tolerant also developed a forerunner of today's RAID systems by incorporating a journaling file system and multiple copies of the disk drive content.

Dale Ship Tolerant Software in January 1988. Tolerant Software produced a journaling file system and a virtual disk management system for the AT&T UNIX platform, which was built by a new team led by John Carmichael.

The firm started out with a relationship with AT&T to provide the file (Veritas File System – VxFS) and disk management (Veritas Volume Manager – VxVM) software for its UNIX operating system, and to jointly market and support the products to the System OEMS (Sun, HP, etc.). The OEM model provided royalties to Veritas when the OEM shipped its products to end users.

On December 9, 1993, the company had its initial public offering (IPO), selling 16 million shares to the public, and valuing the company at $64 million.

Growth and acquisitions
At the end of 1996, Veritas had revenues of $36 million.
 Tidalwave Technologies Acquisition: In 1995 the company acquired Tidalwave Technologies, a small San Francisco-based company for $4.2 million in stock.  Tidalwave specialized in cross-platform High Availability (HA) Software and thus entered the HA business.
 OpenVision Acquisition: In 1997 the company acquired OpenVision Technologies, another public company of the same size, and thus entered the backup business. Although the company only retained $20 million of OpenVision's 1996 base, it completed the 1997 year at $120 million.  It was during this high growth period that the Veritas Board decided to consolidate the various business locations into a 550,000 SF facility in Mountain View, CA.  Ernst & Young Consultants led by David Bentley as the project manager were brought in to lead this effort and soon hired HOK as the architect and Rudolf and Sletten as the general contractor.  The new facility was completed in 2000.  
 Seagate NSMG Acquisition: The company achieved $200 million in 1998, and in 1999 acquired the backup business from Seagate Software, which was also approximately $200 million in 1998. In 1999 the combined company achieved revenues of $700 million, and became the undisputed leader in the Storage Management Software industry. In 2000 the company achieved revenues of $1.2 billion, was added to the S&P 500, became a Fortune 1000 company, and became the tenth largest software company in the world by revenues, and third largest by market capitalization.
 Internet Bubble: In 2001 the industry went through a major downturn as the internet bubble burst. Nonetheless the company was able to achieve revenue growth of 25% to $1.5 billion, and operating margins of 25%.
 Growth of 42X: Through this accelerated growth, Veritas went from a $36 million company to a $1.5 billion company, a growth multiple of 42X in five years.
 April 1997 – Acquired OpenVision Technologies. This included NetBackup.
 May 1999 – Acquired the Network and Storage Management Group of Seagate Software. This included Backup Exec.
 August 2003 – Acquired Israel's Precise Software Solutions, one of the Application Performance Management (APM) leaders, for about $400 million in cash and 7.4 million shares of its stock for a total of about $609 million.

2004–2014: Merger with Symantec
On December 16, 2004, Veritas and Symantec announced their plans for a merger in a deal valued at $13.5 billion. The deal created the fourth-largest software firm in the world to date. Veritas and Symantec's shareholders approved the merger on June 24, 2005, and it was completed on July 2.

2014–2016: Demerger
On October 10, 2014, Symantec announced it planned to split the company into two parts. The security business would remain with Symantec, and the information management business would be known as Veritas Technologies Corporation. The separation of the companies was completed on January 29, 2016.

On August 11, 2015, Symantec announced the sale of its Veritas information management business to The Carlyle Group. Veritas and Symantec achieved operational separation on October 1, 2015. The sale completed on January 30, 2016, when Veritas became a privately held company. The sale to go private was for $8 billion, and represented a mark-down on Symantec stock.

2016: The new beginning 

After the demerger from Symantec in 2016, Veritas rebranded itself as Veritas Technologies LLC. with a new logo. As CEO, Bill Coleman was able to transform the company to have "a startup, win-in-the-marketplace, customer-first culture" during the two-year turnaround. On January 28, 2018, Veritas Technologies LLC. named Greg Hughes as its CEO. With a new brand and a new CEO, Veritas Technologies planned to move its employees to its new headquarters in Santa Clara by the end of summer 2018. In September 2020, Veritas Technologies LLC acquired Los Angeles-based software company Globanet.

Products and services 

 Access
 VxFS and VxVM
 NetBackup
NetBackup Appliances
 Backup Exec
 Cluster Server (VCS)
 Enterprise Vault

 Volume Replicator (VVR)
 SANPoint
 eDiscovery Platform
APTARE IT Analytics™
CloudPoint
SaaS Backup
Desktop and Laptop Option
Flex Appliance
Information Studio
Data Insight
 Veritas Infoscale, data management such as HyperScale for OpenStack
 Resiliency Platform
 Hubstor

Lawsuits
In 1999, VERITAS Software Corp. (VERITAS US) and VERITAS Ireland entered into a  cost-sharing agreement (CSA) which was the subject of litigation with the U.S. Internal Revenue Service.

See also
 Veritas Storage Foundation
 Veritas Cluster File System
 Veritas File System
 Enterprise Vault
Veritas Services and Operations Readiness Tools (SORT)

References

External links
 

Software companies based in the San Francisco Bay Area
Companies based in Santa Clara, California
1983 establishments in California
Private equity portfolio companies
American companies established in 1983
Software companies established in 1983
Gen Digital acquisitions
1993 initial public offerings
2004 mergers and acquisitions
2016 mergers and acquisitions
The Carlyle Group companies
Software companies of the United States